Cryptalaus lacteus is a species of click beetle belonging to the family Elateridae. It is only present in South-East Asia including Indo-China, Malay, Sumatra, Philippines and Borneo.

References

Hitoo Ohira -  Elaterid beetles from Borneo in the Bishop Museum (Coleoptera) (PDF)

Elateridae
Beetles described in 1857